Old All Saints Church is a redundant Anglican church in the village of Great Steeping, Lincolnshire, England. It is recorded in the National Heritage List for England as a designated Grade II* listed building, and is under the care of the Churches Conservation Trust.

History

The church was built in 1748 on the site of an earlier medieval church, and was restored in 1908.  However a new church, also dedicated to All Saints, was built nearer the centre of the village in 1891, and the old church was declared redundant in August 1973.

Architecture

All Saints is constructed in brick with limestone dressings, on a plinth of greenstone rubble.  The roof is tiled.  The architectural style is Georgian.   Its plan is simple, consisting of a nave and chancel under one roof, and a bellcote at the west end.  The bellcote is rectangular and weatherboarded, with a pyramidal roof.  At the west end of the church is a doorway with a moulded architrave and a raised keystone.  Above this is a stone inscribed with the dates 1748 and 1908, and there is a band with a pediment above that.  Along each side of the church are two semicircular-headed windows.  Between the windows on the south side is a sundial.  At the east end is a smaller semicircular-headed window, above which is the outline of the gable of the chancel of the earlier church.

See also
List of churches preserved by the Churches Conservation Trust in the East of England

References

Grade II* listed churches in Lincolnshire
Church of England church buildings in Lincolnshire
Georgian architecture in England
Former Church of England church buildings
Churches completed in 1748
Churches completed in 1908
Churches preserved by the Churches Conservation Trust